Fundy-St. Martins is a village in the Canadian province of New Brunswick. It was formed through the 2023 New Brunswick local governance reforms.

History 
Fundy-St. Martins was incorporated on January 1, 2023.

See also 
List of communities in New Brunswick
List of municipalities in New Brunswick

References 

2023 establishments in New Brunswick
2023 New Brunswick local governance reform
Populated places established in 2023
Villages in New Brunswick